Miangul Aurangzeb (Urdu/Pashto: میاں گل اورنگزیب‎ 28 May 1928 – 3 August 2014) was the last Wali Ahad (Crown Prince) of the former Swat State, the son of the last Wali of Swat, Miangul Jahan Zeb and the son -in-law of the former president of Pakistan, Muhammad Ayub Khan. He served in the National Assembly of Pakistan and as governor of Balochistan and subsequently as governor of the Khyber-Pakhtunkhwa.

Early life
He was born on 28 May 1928 in Saidu Sharif in the house of Miangul Jahan Zeb,  (the wali of Swat). He received his initial schooling at Welham Boys' School and The Doon School in Dehradun.  He then attended St. Stephen's College, Delhi.

Army career
Following the independence of Pakistan, Aurangzeb enrolled at the Pakistan Military Academy, Kakul in 1948. He was commissioned into the Guides Cavalry (FF) of the Pakistan Armoured Corps.

During his service in the Pakistan Army, he passed the Junior Officer's Course, the Advanced Infantry Course (Quetta) and the Junior Officer Leadership and Weapons Course (Nowshera). His achievements led to his selection as ADC (aide de camp) to the Army Commander in Chief General Ayub Khan.

In 1955, he married the daughter of General Ayub Khan and thereafter quit the army service to enter into politics.

Public life
Aurangzeb represented Swat State in the West Pakistan Assembly from 1956 to May 1958, when he was nominated to the National Assembly of Pakistan.

After the imposition of martial law in 1958, all legislative bodies were dissolved, and civilian rule did not return until 1962. Aurangzeb was nominated to the National Assembly in 1962, and re-nominated in 1965.

After the resignation of President Ayub Khan in 1969, the Government of Pakistan under President Yahya Khan took over the administration of all the remaining princely states including Swat.

In 1970 the first ever one-man one-vote general elections were held in Pakistan, which marked a new chapter for the former ruling family of Swat. Aurangzeb was elected on a Muslim League platform, defeating a strong candidate of the National Awami Party.

He was re-elected in the March 1977 general elections as a Pakistan National Alliance candidate (anti-Bhutto) despite suspected widespread rigging by the rival Pakistan Peoples Party candidate.

Due to his opposition to the government of Prime Minister Zulfikar Ali Bhutto, Aurangzeb supported the military government of General Muhammad Zia-ul-Haq, and from 1981 served as a member of the nominated Majlis i Shoora (Federal Council).

In March 1985 general elections were held on a non-party basis, and Aurangzeb was again elected to the National Assembly of Pakistan.

Following the tumultuous events of 1988, party-based democracy returned to Pakistan and general elections were once again held in November 1988. Aurangzeb, contesting on the Islami Jamhoori Ittehad platform was defeated by his cousin and son-in-law Shahzada Aman i Room, the candidate of the Pakistan Peoples Party.

Again in October 1990, Aurangzeb, contesting as an independent candidate faced defeat, this time at the hands of his former allies, the Islami Jamhoori Ittehad.

However, he bounced back in the October 1993 general elections to regain his seat, and continued to hold it at the February 1997 general elections.

In April 1997, Prime Minister Nawaz Sharif appointed him as Governor of Balochistan, and Aurangzeb resigned from the National Assembly. The subsequent by-election resulted in a victory for his son, engineer Miangul Adnan Aurangzeb.

In August 1999, Aurangzeb was appointed the Governor of Khyber-Pakhtunkhwa and served in that capacity until the military takeover by General Pervez Musharraf on 24 October 1999.

He did not contest the 2002 general elections and retired from electoral politics, passing the torch to the next generation of his family. He remained active until his death in the leadership of the Pakistan Muslim League Nawaz.

As a result of death threats from and loss of security in Swat to the Tehreek-e-Nafaz-e-Shariat-e-Mohammadi under Maulana Fazlullah in 2007, Aurangzeb spent an extended period of time at his house in Islamabad. With the return of stability in the area Aurangzeb resumed living at the family compound in Saidu Sharif. Due to prolonged illness, he set aside himself from politics and spent rest of his life at house in Islamabad till his death on 3 August 2014. He is buried in his ancestral graveyard at Aqba, Saidu Sharif.

See also
Miangul Jahan Zeb
Miangul Adnan Aurangzeb
Miangul Hassan Aurangzeb
Swat (princely state)

References

External links
Swat Royal Family the Miangul Family Tree
Pakistan International News – Son reports Wali returns to Swat
Miangul Aurangzeb Interview

1928 births
Governors of Khyber Pakhtunkhwa
Governors of Balochistan, Pakistan
People from Swat District
The Doon School alumni
Swat royal family
People from Islamabad
2014 deaths
Pakistani MNAs 1955–1958